The Aja also spelled Adja are an ethnic group native to  south-western Benin and south-eastern Togo.
According to oral tradition, the Aja migrated to southern Benin in the 12th or 13th century from Tado on the Mono River, and c. 1600, three brothers, Kokpon, Do-Aklin, and Te-Agbanlin, split the ruling of the region then occupied by the Aja amongst themselves: Kokpon took the capital city of Great Ardra, reigning over the Allada kingdom; Do-Aklin founded Abomey, which would become capital of the Kingdom of Dahomey; and Te-Agbanlin founded Little Ardra, also known as Ajatche, later called Porto Novo (literally, "New Port") by Portuguese traders and the current capital city of Benin.

History
Those Aja living in Abomey mingled with the local people, thus creating a new people known as the Fon, or "Dahomey" ethnic group. This group is now the largest in Benin. Another source claims the Aja were the rulers of Dahomey (Benin) until 1893, when the French conquered them.

The Aja speak a language known as Aja-Gbe, or simply 'Aja'; only 1-5% are literate in their native tongue.  According to one source, voodoo originated with the Aja. Most Gbe speaking people especially the Ewe and Fon trace their origins to Adja Tado (formerly known as Azame ) and consider Adja as their mother tribe. The Gbe people claimed to have met the Alu , Za along with some  light skinned dwarfish people with straight hair - possibly pygmies or remnant bushmen (San) -in the vicinity when they arrived from southwest Nigeria via Ketou.  Scarcity of natural resources , overpopulation and chieftaincy disputes contributed to the separation and dispersal of both the Ewe and later the Fon from Adja. The Awormezi ( the paramount stool) of Anlo in the Volta Region of Ghana is reputed to be the original stool of Adja Tado and was taken away by Torgbui Sri ( a prince) to Notsie when succession dispute arose among the claimants of the stool after the death of the occupant. An outbreak of smallpox decimated the Adja population in ancient times, thus reducing their population in comparison to the descendant Ewe or Fon. There are three dialects: Tàgóbé (in Togo only), Dògóbè (in Benin only), and Hwègbè (in both countries). Many are trilingual, also speaking French and Fongbe, the lingua-franca of southern Benin, while Ewe is spoken as a second language by those Aja living in Togo and Ghana.

Due to severe land shortages in the densely populated Togolese-Beninois border region mentioned above, many Aja have migrated in recent years, seeking arable land for subsistence farming or work in urban centers.  There are a significant number of Aja living throughout the coastal region of Benin and Togo, southern Nigeria and Gabon.  The urban centers of Cotonou, Lome, Lagos and Libreville all have significant Aja migrant populations.

The Aja, Fon, Ewe, Ga-Adangbe accounted for most of the people carried to the Americas from the Bight of Benin, Togo and Ghana in the transatlantic slave trade prior to the late eighteenth century (when Yoruba people became the more common captives from the region).

Etymology

Yoruba language- Ata: ado: mi - Now the village will grow and prosper 

Adja Tado was originally known as Azame. In ancient times there was a debilitating smallpox outbreak in Adja Tado resulting in a massive loss of life. 
A Yoruba traditional priest purified the town and stemmed the spread of the epidemic.

He assured the survivors in his native Yoruba with those words and with the passage of time, Azame came to be known as Atado.

References

Further reading
In the context of slavery:

External links
 Aja and Fon people in images and stories

Ethnic groups in Benin
Ethnic groups in Togo